Hippoporidra is a genus of bryozoans belonging to the family Hippoporidridae.

The species of this genus are found in Atlantic Ocean.

Species

Species:

Hippoporidra barrerei 
Hippoporidra calacarea 
Hippoporidra calcarea

References

Bryozoan genera